Olympia Leisure Centre may refer to:

Olympia Leisure Centre (1974) in Dundee, Scotland
Olympia Leisure Centre (2013) in Dundee, Scotland